PCCA may refer to:
 Pine Castle Christian Academy, a private school in Pine Castle, Florida
 Pinellas County Center for the Arts, a magnet school in Pinellas County, Florida
 Plains Cotton Cooperative Association
 Professional Compounding Centers of America, a pharmaceutical organization
 Propionyl Coenzyme A carboxylase, alpha polypeptide
 Portable Computer and Communications Association
 Partners in Confronting Collective Atrocities
 Pewter Collectors Club of America, Inc., a non-profit educational group